Fieldton is an unincorporated community in Lamb County, Texas, United States. Fieldton has a post office with the ZIP code 79326.

Geography
Fieldton lies on the high plains of the Llano Estacado in eastern Lamb County at the intersection of Farm to Market roads 37 and 1072, just to the north of Blackwater Draw, a dry tributary of the Double Mountain Fork Brazos River.

Basic facts
Elevation: 3,579′,

Population: 126 (2000)

See also
Blackwater Draw
Yellow House Canyon
Llano Estacado
West Texas

References

External links

Unincorporated communities in Lamb County, Texas
Unincorporated communities in Texas